In a Million Years is the debut studio album by Australian indie rock band, Last Dinosaurs. The album was released on 2 March 2012 by Dew Process. It serves as the follow-up of their debut EP, Back from the Dead (2010). The album's title was announced after the release of their second single, "Zoom". The album debuted at number 8 in the Australian Albums Chart.

Reception

The album garnered very positive reviews from music critics. Davey Boy from Sputnikmusic summarize his review, "Aussie indie-pop that uses influences from practically every continent." Andrew Wade of the AU review said "The album is a surprisingly mature and cohesive collection of songs. With incredibly slick production and the catchiest songs you’ll hear this side of 2000, In A Million Years is a strong contender for the best Australian album of the past twenty years." The album also received an average 5/5 user rating on both Triple J's User Review and iTunes User Ratings. "Andy" was also placed at No. 95 in the Triple J Hottest 100 in 2012.

Track listing

Charts

Credits
Band
 Sean Caskey - vocals, guitar
 Lachlan Caskey - lead guitar
 Sam Gethin-Jones - bass guitar, backing vocals
 Dan Koyama - drums, percussion
 A. Julca - maracas

Production
 Jean-Paul Fung – producer, engineer, musician, mix engineer*
 Eliot James – mix engineer
 Stu McCullough – management
 Dan Koyama – art director

References

2012 debut albums
Last Dinosaurs albums
Dew Process albums